Néstor Igor Cantillana (born July 19, 1975 in Santiago) is a Chilean actor in theater, movies and TV.

Life and career
Cantillana's grandmother was a communist and later she practiced the evangelic religion and he grew up under that doctrine until 12 years old in Curicó. He used to play the piano in the local church. He studied in the theater academy of Fernando González.

Since 1994 he has participated in theater work such as Historia de la Sangre (1995), Calígula (1998), Hamlet (2000) and La Herencia (2000).

In 1995, Cantillana traveled to the Canadian city of Montreal with the play "Historia de la Sangre". The following year, 1996, he participated in the same play in Berlin, a city where he would return that same year with the play La misión. In 1998, the actor would return to Germany to present the same play in Munich, Bonn and Stuttgart.

In 1996, Cantillana received the award for best actor for his role in the play Despertar de Primavera, presented in the third Nuevas Tendencias Teatrales festival.

He made his debut in the telenovela world in the role of Patricio Tepano in Iorana (1998) from TVN, he then performed some other characters, among them, an AIDS victim, a common employee, a frustrated detective and a young homosexual doctor.

Cantillana was nominated for an Altazor Award for his role in the soap opera Romané and he won the APES award as the best actor in the year 2000.

He had the protagonist role in the TVN soap opera, Corazón de María (2007), where he plays Miguel.

He has one of the mains roles in the HBO series Prófugos. He also has supporting role in the TVN series Los Archivos del Cardenal. This series tells the ordeals of a group of lawyers than works for Vicaria de la Solidaridad an office within the Catholic Church that investigates crimes by Augusto Pinochet's secret police against left-wing people.

He acted in the movie Radio Corazón (the sequel to El Chacotero Sentimental), with Claudia Di Girólamo, Tamara Acosta and Manuela Martelli, under director Roberto Artiagoitía (El Rumpy) and with screenwriter Pablo Illanes. The argument represents the personal relations among family members and combines various elements, principally comedy, with some romance and drama aspects. He also played supporting roles in the Oscar-nominated No (2012) and the Oscar-winning drama A Fantastic Woman (2017).

Filmography

Television

Soap operas 
 Iorana (TVN, 1998) - Patricio Tepano
 La Fiera (TVN, 1999) - Carlos Lizana
 Romané (TVN, 2000) - Escudero
 Pampa Ilusión (TVN, 2001) - Tobías Pincheira
 El Circo de las Montini (TVN, 2002) - Rodrigo Marín
 Puertas Adentro (TVN, 2003) - Raúl Brito
 Los Pincheira (TVN, 2004) - Santos Molina
 Cómplices (TVN, 2006) - Sebastián Opazo
 Corazón de María (TVN, 2007) - Miguel Villa
 Viuda Alegre (2008) - Andrés Tapia
 Sin Anestesia (2009) - Dr. Quiñores
 Peleles (2011) - Fabian

Series and other TV shows 
 Cuentos Chilenos (Gracia y el forastero) (2000) - Gabriel
 Cuentos Chilenos (2001)
 Mira Tú (2002) - Maxi
 Profugos (2011) - Vicente Ferragut

Stage 
 Cada vez que ladra los perros
 Le senttiment de la langue
 Historia de la Sangre (1995)
 Despertar de Primavera (1996)
 La Misión (1998)
 Calígula (1998)
 La Herencia (2000)
 Hamlet (2000)
 De noche, justo antes de los bosques (2004)
 Roberto Zucco (2006)
 Sueño con revólver (2007)
 Pelo Negro, Boca Arriba (2007)

References

External links
 

1975 births
20th-century Chilean male actors
Chilean male film actors
Living people
People from Santiago
21st-century Chilean male actors
Chilean male television actors
Chilean male stage actors
Democratic Revolution politicians